is a Japanese actress. Ashikawa was called the Japanese Audrey Hepburn.

In 1953, Ashikawa was scouted by director Yuzo Kawashima and joined the Shochiku studio. She made her film debut with Tokyomadamu to Osakafujin directed by Yuzo Kawashima. In 1955, she moved to the Nikkatsu studio and gained popularity. In 1968, Ashikawa married actor Tatsuya Fuji and retired. She made her final film appearance in the 1968 film Koto no Taiyo.

Selected filmography
Tokyomadamu to Osakafujin (1953)
 The Baby Carriage (1956)
 The Balloon (1956)
 Sun in the Last Days of the Shogunate (1957)
 Suzaki Paradise: Akashingō (1957)
 Man Who Causes a Storm (1957)
 The Perfect Game (1958)
 Kurenai no Tsubasa (1958)
 A Slope in the Sun (1959)
 Mutekiga Ore o Yondeiru (1960)
 Man with a Shotgun (1961)
  (1961)
  (1962)
  (1965)
 Outlaw:Gangster VIP 2 (1968)
 Koto no Taiyo (1968)

References

External links 

1935 births
Living people
Japanese film actresses
Actresses from Tokyo